Banjevac is a village in Serbia. It is situated in the Krupanj municipality, in the Mačva District of Central Serbia.

Population
The village had a Serb ethnic majority and a population of 500 in 2002.

Historical population

1948: 669
1953: 648
1961: 606
1971: 605
1981: 519
1991: 525
2002: 500

References

See also
List of places in Serbia

Populated places in Mačva District